The Security Building is an 11-story building in Saint Louis, Missouri, built in 1892 in what was then the city's downtown financial district. Designed by Boston architects Peabody, Stearns & Furber, the building is of granite on the bottom two floors, with pink limestone and brick above. The building is on the National Register of Historic Places and designated an official landmark by the City of St. Louis.

It was listed on the National Register in 2000. It was deemed notable due to its architecture and also as one of just eight surviving out of about 30 tall office buildings built in St. Louis in the late 1800s.

References

National Register of Historic Places in St. Louis
Neoclassical architecture in Missouri
Buildings and structures completed in 1892
Downtown St. Louis
1892 establishments in Missouri
Tourist attractions in St. Louis